Daviesia elongata is a species of flowering plant in the family Fabaceae and is endemic to the south-west of Western Australia. It is a glabrous, spreading or sprawling shrub with narrowly egg-shaped to linear phyllodes and yellow-orange and maroon flowers.

Description

Taxonomy
Daviesia elongata was first formally described in 1864 by George Bentham in Flora Australiensis. The specific epithet (elongata) means "lengthened", referring to the phyllodes.

In 1995, Michael Crisp described two subspecies in Australian Systematic Botany, but only the name of the autonym is accepted by the Australian Plant Census:
 Daviesia elongata Benth. subsp. elongata;
 Daviesia elongata subsp. implexa Crisp.

Distribution and habitat
This species of pea grows in the heathy understorey of forest near Carbunup and Busselton.

Conservation status
Daviesia elongata subsp. elongata is listed as "vulnerable" under the Australian Government Environment Protection and Biodiversity Conservation Act 1999 and as "Threatened Flora (Declared Rare Flora — Extant)" by the Department of Biodiversity, Conservation and Attractions. The main threats to the species include disturbance during road maintenance, inappropriate fire regimes and weed invasion.

References

elongata
Flora of Western Australia
Taxa named by George Bentham
Plants described in 1864